Italian Formula 4 Championship is the first formula racing series regulated according to FIA Formula 4 regulations. The inaugural season was the 2014 Italian F4 Championship, effectively replacing the Formula Abarth.

History
Gerhard Berger and the FIA Singleseater Commission launched the FIA Formula 4 in March 2013. The goal of the Formula 4 is to make the ladder to Formula 1 more transparent. Besides sporting and technical regulations, costs are regulated too. A car to compete in this category may not exceed €30,000 in purchase. A single season in Formula 4 may not exceed €100,000 in costs. The Italian Formula 4 was the first FIA Formula 4 championship to be launched. The Italian championship was launched by the ACI-CSAI on December 12, 2013.

WSK Promotions, well known for its kart races in the WSK Euro Series e.a., was contracted to promote the championship.

Cars

Italian race car constructor Tatuus was contracted to design and build all the cars.  Tatuus had also built all the cars for the Formula Abarth. The chassis is a monocoque made of carbon fibre.

The engine is a 1400cc Fiat-FPT. This is the same engine used in the Formula Abarth between 2010 and 2013.

Starting from 2022, Tatuus F4-T-421 have been used instead of Tatuus F4-T014.

Champions

Drivers

Teams

Winter Trophy

Trophy
In the concurrent Italian F4 Trophy for drivers over the age of 18.

Woman Trophy

Rookie Class
The result of the championship was decided by different standings. Wins and points of the rookie standings are present in brackets.

Drivers graduated to F2 

 Bold denotes an active Formula 2 driver.
 Gold background denotes Italian F4 champion.

Circuits 

 Bold denotes a circuit will be used in the 2023 season.

Notes

References

External links
 
 
 

 
Formula racing series
Recurring sporting events established in 2014
Formula 4 series
Auto racing series in Italy